Hautot-sur-Mer (literally Hautot on Sea) is a commune in the Seine-Maritime department in the Normandy region in northern France.

Geography
A small town of farming and light industry situated in the Pays de Caux, immediately to the west of Dieppe, at the junction of the D 75, D 56 and D 925 roads. The chalk cliffs and pebble beach of the commune look out over the English Channel. The river Scie flows through the commune and to the sea at the small tourist resort of Pourville.

History
The commune was formed in 1822 by the joining together of the communes of Hautot ("Hotot" in 1240), Petit-Appeville and Pourville, on the coast. It was here that a large force of Canadian soldiers came ashore during the ill-fated Dieppe Raid on 19 August 1942.

Heraldry

Population

Places of interest

 A nineteenth century château
 The ruins of a feudal castle
 A memorial to the World War II raid, built in 2002.
 The two churches of St.Remi, both dating from the sixteenth century
 The modern church at Petit-Appeville
 Two 16th-century stone crosses

See also
Communes of the Seine-Maritime department

References

Communes of Seine-Maritime
Populated coastal places in France